This is a list of shopping malls in Bahrain.

Manama

Sea Front District 
City Centre Bahrain
The Avenues

Suwayfiyah 
Dana Mall

Naim 
Marina Mall

Manama Center 
Moda Mall

Seef District 
Seef Mall

Juffair 
Juffair Mall
Oasis Mall

Bu Ghazal 
Galleria

Aali
Al Ramli Mall

Isa Town

Al Seef Isa Town Mall

Janabiya
El Mercado Mall
Kingdom Mall
The Atrium

Sanabis
The Bahrain Mall

Muharraq
Al Hidd Mall "Lulu"
Lulu HyperMarket/Muharraq Central Market- Muharraq
Oasis Mall
Seef Al Muharraq Mall Bahrain

Riffa

Bu Kowarah  
 Al Enma Mall

Buhair 
Oasis Mall

Wadi al Sail 
Wadi Al Sail Mall

Saar
Saar Mall

Sanad
Al Alawi Mall

Sitra
Sitra Mall

See also
List of tourist attractions in Bahrain

References 

Shopping malls
Bahrain
 
Retailing in Bahrain